Slim Devices, Inc. was a consumer electronics company based in Mountain View, California, United States.  Their main product was the Squeezebox network music player which connects to a home ethernet or Wi-Fi network, and allows the owner to stream digital audio over the network to a stereo. The company, founded in 2000, was originally most notable for their support of open-source software, namely their SlimServer software which their products at that time all depended upon, and is still available as a free download and modification by any interested developer.

On 18 October 2006 Sean Adams, the CEO of Slim Devices, announced that the company was being fully acquired by Logitech.

Slim Devices was featured in the December 2006 issue of Fast Company magazine.  The article focused on the company's business model and profiled the three key leaders: Sean Adams (CEO), Dean Blackketter (CTO), and Patrick Cosson (VP of Marketing).

References
 Tew, Sarah.  "Logitech leaves Squeezebox fans wondering what's next", CNET. September 24, 2012.  Retrieved November 14, 2014.
 Merritt, Rick.  "Digital audio startup finds edge in open-source code", EE Times.  August 9, 2004.  Retrieved December 14, 2005.
 Smith, Tony. "Slim Devices adds 802.11g to wireless MP3 player", The Register.  March 11, 2005.  Retrieved December 14, 2005.
 Pogue, David. "Video review of Squeezebox 3", New York Times.  February 9, 2006.  Retrieved December 2, 2006.
 Atkinson, John. "Slim Devices Squeezebox WiFi D/A processor", Stereophile.  September 2006.  Retrieved December 2, 2006.
 Deutschman, Alan.  "Ears Wide Open", Fast Company. December 2006.  Retrieved January 6, 2007.

Footnotes

Electronics companies of the United States
Companies based in Mountain View, California
American companies established in 2000
Electronics companies established in 2000
2000 establishments in California
2006 mergers and acquisitions
Logitech